Will is the third album by Irish musician Leo O'Kelly. It was released on 18 March 2011 by Life & Living Records and consists of a collaboration with Liverpool writer John McKeown, who wrote poems that constitute album's lyrics, then adapted in music by O'Kelly.

Track listing

Personnel
 Leo O'Kelly – vocals, guitars, violin, synthesizer, bongos, drum programming
 Hetty Lane – vocals on tracks 1, 5, 6, 7 and 8, harmonica on "The End of Love"
 Garvan Gallagher – bass guitar and Clevinger double bass
 Sonny Condell – Moroccan pottery drums on "Alcohol"
 Holly Cooper (credited as Barry Whiteside) – ukulele on "Will"

Production
 John McKeown – lyrics
 Leo O'Kelly – production, recording and mixing
 Louise McCormick – recording at Sirius Art Centre and mixing at Manor Studio, Cobh on "Alcohol"
 John Crone – recording at Sirius Art Centre on "Alcohol"
 Andy le Wien – mastering at RMS
 David O'Toole – cover design, insert photo
 Peter Mirolo – front sleeve photography

Release history

References

2011 albums
Leo O'Kelly albums
Albums produced by Leo O'Kelly